The Curse is a trade paperback collecting comic stories based on the Angel television series.

Story description

General synopsis

Having survived the battle of "Not Fade Away", we find Angel in Romania. He has traveled there in the hope he can find the Kalderesh clan, the Gypsies who cursed him with a soul. Angel believes that he deserves some happiness with a woman, possibly with Nina having been through so much and lost so many that had been close to him.

Instead Angel finds a gypsy fighting force struggling against the oppressive regime of Corneliu Brasov. Meanwhile the single remaining member of the Kalderesh Clan, Natalya, may be the only one who can remove Angel's curse.

Angel: The Curse #1
In an unspecified amount of time since surviving from events in "Not Fade Away" Angel is running through the Romanian forest. He hopes to search for the Gypsy tribe that placed a curse upon him.

Angel: The Curse #2
In Romania, Angel finds a Gypsy fighting force who are struggling against the oppressive regime of Corneliu Brasov. Not knowing who he is, they have little want of his help. Brasov commands a vampire army to eliminate Angel.

Angel: The Curse #3
Warlord Corneliu Brasov's has his men raid a hideout, Angel can't prevent bloodshed, yet still ultimately hopes to get help from the clan in removing his curse.

Angel: The Curse #4
A battle is being fought between Corneliu Brasov and his opposers, Angel must make a choice which may determine his own fate and that of the battle. Meanwhile the single remaining member of the Kalderesh Clan, Natalya, maybe the only one who can remove Angel's curse.

Angel: The Curse #5
Angel's attempts to help Romany allies fight for freedom, erupts into war. Angel tracks down Brasov, and discovers Natalya has been turned into a vampire. He dusts Natalya thus destroying his chance to remove his curse.

Continuity
Supposed to be set after Angel season 5. After the episode "Not Fade Away".
Just before Old Friends

Canonical issues

Angel comics such as this one are not usually considered by fans as canonical. Some fans consider them stories from the imaginations of authors and artists, while other fans consider them as taking place in an alternative fictional reality. However, unlike fan fiction, overviews summarising their story, written early in the writing process, were 'approved' by both Fox and Joss Whedon (or his office), and the books were therefore later published as officially Buffy merchandise.

References.

References

Angel (1999 TV series) comics
2005 comics debuts
2005 comics endings
Comics by Jeff Mariotte